Ri Yong-sik is a North Korean politician and agitator.

Biography
In 2014 he was appointed to be the Chief editor of Rodong Sinmun, the mouthpiece of the Workers' Party of Korea, replacing . In 2016, following the decision of the 7th Congress of the Workers' Party of Korea he was elected to the 7th Central Committee of the Workers' Party of Korea.

References

Living people
Year of birth missing (living people)
Place of birth missing (living people)
North Korean propagandists
Members of the 8th Central Committee of the Workers' Party of Korea